Anne-Li Sjölund (born 1966) is a Swedish politician. , she serves as Member of the Riksdag representing the constituency of Västernorrland County. She became a member after Emil Källström resigned.

She was also elected as Member of the Riksdag in September 2022.

References 

Living people
1966 births
Place of birth missing (living people)
21st-century Swedish women politicians
Members of the Riksdag from the Centre Party (Sweden)
Members of the Riksdag 2018–2022
Members of the Riksdag 2022–2026
Women members of the Riksdag